"Rose, My Rocket-Brain!" is a 2004 single by the band Stereolab for the tour of the album Margerine Eclipse. It was available as a 7" vinyl and 3" CD. The back of the CD sleeve lists the first two songs, "Rose, My Rocket-Brain! (Rose, le cerveau électronique de ma fusée!)" and "Banana Monster ne répond plus" the wrong way round.

Unlike other tour singles which were largely instrumental, "Rose, My Rocket-Brain!" has a full lyric. The song questions the validity of the 2003 invasion of Iraq and represents a return to the more directly political nature of the group's early material.

Track listing
 "Rose, My Rocket-Brain! (Rose, le cerveau électronique de ma fusée!)"
 "Banana Monster ne répond plus"
 "University Microfilms International"

References

2004 singles
2004 songs